Joged dance is a style of dance from the Island of Bali derived from the traditional Gandrung dance. The term joged or joget is also a common word for dance in Indonesia. The dance is typically accompanied by a gamelan ensemble of bamboo instruments called a gamelan joged bumbung. Dancers usually wear attire consisting of a Kebaya and Sarong Unlike most Balinese dance, joged is not a religious and ritual one, it is a secular social dance for entertainment purposes only. During a joged performance, a single or several female dancers will perform for usually predominantly male audience to dance with them. Dancers may often invite a spectator to join in the joged using a fan and sash. which unlike many dances has no set moves and is largely improvised. It is considered impolite to refuse such an invitation. 

The dance often involves erotic movements and teasing, ranging from humorous to seductive interactions between the dancers with their male counterpart. The more provocative nature that this dance can have was called "[incompatible] with the ethics of Balinese culture" by Putu Beratha, head of Bali Province's Cultural Affairs Department, with a youth-led movement Stop Joged Jaruh attempting to remove recordings of the dance from YouTube. In 2016 Governor Made Mangku Pastika attempted to ban the dance, calling it "pornographic". In August 2017 the Bali Provincial Government held a joged bumbung festival to attempt to improve the dance.

The dance is quite comparable with other Indonesian dance traditions; such as those of Javanese ronggeng and Sundanese jaipongan.

See also

 Balinese dance
 Dance in Indonesia

References

Dances of Bali
Balinese culture